John Laidley (1791–1863) was a prominent Virginia lawyer and politician.

Laidley was born in Morgantown, (West) Virginia and at age twenty-one served as a militia Colonel in the War of 1812.

As an adult, Laidley made his home in Cabell County, serving as a prosecuting attorney until his death. In 1829, he was elected to the Virginia Constitutional Convention of 1829-1830, appointed to the Committee of the Judicial Department. He was one of four delegates elected from the western Senatorial district of Kanawha, Mason, Cabell, Randolph, Harrison, Lewis, Wood and Logan Counties.

In 1837, he was one of the founders of Marshall University in present West Virginia.

References

Marshall University: The Early Years
 Virgil A. Lewis, "A History of Marshall Academy" (1912), p. 9 n. 2.

Bibliography

1791 births
1863 deaths
Marshall University people
Virginia lawyers
19th-century American lawyers